is a Japanese cross-country skier. She competed in five events at the 1998 Winter Olympics.

References

External links
 

1972 births
Living people
Japanese female cross-country skiers
Olympic cross-country skiers of Japan
Cross-country skiers at the 1998 Winter Olympics
Sportspeople from Niigata Prefecture
Asian Games medalists in cross-country skiing
Cross-country skiers at the 1999 Asian Winter Games
Asian Games silver medalists for Japan
Medalists at the 1999 Asian Winter Games
20th-century Japanese women